Gyalpozhing or Gyelpozhing is a town in Mongar District in southeastern-central Bhutan. It is located to the west of Mongar and east of Lingmethang.

It is located on the base of Kuri Chhu.

Its population was 2,291 at the 2005 census.

References
Armington, S. (2002) Bhutan. (2nd ed.) Melbourne: Lonely Planet.

External links
Satellite map at Maplandia.com

Populated places in Bhutan